The Bakhtiari (also spelled Bakhtiyari) are a Lur tribe from Iran. They speak the Bakhtiari dialect of the Luri language.

Bakhtiaris primarily inhabit Chaharmahal and Bakhtiari and eastern Khuzestan, Lorestan, Bushehr, and Isfahan provinces. Bakhtiari tribes have an especially large population concentration in the cities of Masjed Soleyman, Izeh, Shahr-e Kord, and Andika, and the surrounding villages.

A small percentage of Bakhtiari are still nomadic pastoralists, migrating between summer quarters (sardsīr or yaylāq) and winter quarters (garmsīr or qishlāq). Numerical estimates of their total population vary widely.

Origins
Although there have been several suggested theories for the origin of the Bakhtiyaris, historians and researchers generally agree that they are Lurs. According to folklore, the Lurs are descended from a group of youngsters who survived and fled from the demon Zahhak, a demonic figure who is mentioned in Zoroastrian mythology, as well as the Shahnameh. They took shelter in Zardkuh and Kuhrang, where they named themselves Lur ("nomadic"). Due to their luck of escaping danger throughout their history, they called themselves bakhtiyar ("fortunate"). In scholarship, it has been suggested Bakhtiyaris are descended from the Uxian tribe, who clashed with the Macedonian king Alexander the Great in Khuzestan 330 BC. 

A second theory suggests that the Bakhtiyaris were originally from Fars, but were settled to the north of Isfahan and Khuzestan after the legendary king Kay Khosrow conquered Media. A third theory suggests that the Bakhtiyaris were descended from the Mardi, a nomadic warrior tribe that lived around the Caspian coast of northern Iran. Due to the close resemblance to the names Bakhtiyari and Bakhtari (Bactrian), some historians have suggested that the Bakhtiyaris are descended from the Greeks who ruled over Bactria. The resemblance between Bakhtiyari and Greek dance has been used as further proof. Other historians consider the Bakhtiyaris to have resided in their area for a long time, and that they named themselves after the ancient Persian word Bakhtar ("the West") due to their geographical position.

Another theory supported by some historians is that the Bakhtiyaris are descended from Izz al-Dawla Bakhtiyar, the Buyid ruler of Iraq. The name of the latter is first attestation of the word Bakhtiyar. The Bakhtiyaris themselves consider their name to be derived from the word Bakhtiyarwand, the name of the offspring of Bakhtiyar, a distinguished figure of Lur-i Buzurg (Greater Lur).

Genetics
According to research into NRY markers, the Bakhtiari, as with many other groups in Iran, show very elevated frequencies for Y-DNA haplogroup J2— a trait common for Eurasian populations, likely originating in Anatolia and the Caucusus The Southwest Eurasian haplogroups F, G, and T1a also reach substantial frequency among Bakhtiaris.

Etymology
The term bakhtiari can be best translated as "companion of fortune" or "bearer of good luck" The term has deep Persian roots, and is the result of two smaller words bakht and yar complied together. Bakht is the Persian word for "fortune" and yar, iar, iari literally means "companion".

The latter designation largely relates to the nature of the tribe's annual "migration". This has to do with the harsh nature of Bakhtiari life, and overcoming of countless difficulties that Bakhtiaris have faced in the Zagros ranges. In this sense, Bakhtiaris view themselves as a hardworking tribe, facing numerous obstacles everyday, and yet fortunate enough to overcome each of these challenges as a solid unit.

Nevertheless, the origins of Bakhtiaris are ancient, and it may have very well been the case that the tribe underwent a series of name changes throughout its history. However it is mostly claimed that the designation "Bakhtiari" came largely into use some time in antiquity.

In The Ascent of Man, Jacob Bronowski states that "The Bakhtiari take their name from a legendary herdsman of Mongol times, Bakhtyar," who according to a Bakhtiari origin myth is "the father of [their] people". Bronowski points out similarities between Bakhtyar and the Israelite Jacob, who was also the ancestral patriarch of his nomadic people and a herdsman who had two wives.

History
In , Lorestan was split up into realms; Lur-i Buzurg (Greater Lur) and Lur-i Kuchak (Lesser Lur). The Bakhtiyaris are first attested in history in the early 15th-century. In 1413, the arrival of several Bakhtiyari clans such as the Astarki, Kutwand, Raki, Janaki and Zallaki are mentioned by the Timurid-era historian Mu'in al-Din Natanzi. Under the Safavids, Lur-i Kuchak became known as Luristan-i Fili, while Lur-i Buzurg (extending from Isfahan to Kohgiluyeh and from Shushtar to Behbahan) became Bakhtiyari land. In 1566, Shah Tahmasp I selected the Astarki chieftain Tajmir as ilkhan of the Bakhtiyari. He was, however, later killed and succeeded by Jahangir Khan Bakhtiyari, who is responsible for splitting the Bakhtiyaris into two groups, the Haft Lang and Chahar Lang. By the time of the reign of Shah Abbas I, the northern part of Lur-i Buzurg became known as Bakhtiyari.

Constitutional Revolution: In Iran's contemporary history, the Bakhtiari have played a significant role; particularly during the advent of the country's Constitutional Revolution (1905–1907). This event was largely secured through the Bakhtari campaign, which eventually deposed Mohammad Ali Shah Qajar (r. 1907–1909). The Bakhtiari tribesmen, under the leadership of the Haft Lang khans Sardar Assad and his brother Najaf Qoli Khan Bakhtiari- Saad ad-Daula (also referred to as Samsam-os Saltane), captured Tehran and, as a result, saved the revolution. These events eventually led to the abdication of Mohammad Ali Shah Qajar (r. 1907–1909) in 1909, and his exile to Russia. This incident secured Saad ad-Daula the position of Prime Minister in the period that followed the abdication of the Qajar Shah. Nonetheless, with Russian backing, the Shah would soon return in 1911 by landing with a coalition of forces at Astarabad .  However, his efforts to reclaim his throne would bear no fruit. In this sense, the Bakhtiaris played a critical role in saving the revolution from the Qajar forces.

Pahlavi Period: With the expansion of Bakhtiari influence, urban elites (particularly in Tehran) began to worry in regards to a potential Bakhtiari takeover of Persia's affairs. Prior to this point, the Bakhtiari had largely remained within their own territorial boundaries. The Bakhtiari influence would continue to play an important role within the early 20th century politics of Iran. Reza Shah Pahlavi (r. 1925–1941) made the destruction of the Bakhtiari influence his mission. The existence of oil on Bakhtiari territory further motivated the Pahlavi monarch to undermine the autonomy of the tribe, and force its population to adhere to the commands of the central government. Reza Shah Pahlavi would eventually execute a few noteworthy tribal leaders to crush Bakhtiari autonomy and maintain control over the tribe. Amongst the executed Khans was Mohammad Reza Khan (Sardar-e-Fateh), whose son later became the Pahlavi Prime Minister Shapour Bakhtiar. The latter event was a turning point for Bakhtiari and their rise within Iranian politics.

Tribal structure

The Bakhtiari people trace a common lineage, being divided into two branches, Chahar Lang (English: Four Shares) and Haft Lang (English: Seven Shares), each branch being divided into different sub-branches (bāb, tāyefe, tireh, tash, fāmil and owlād). Lang word in bakhtiari dialect means "share of tax or inheritance". 

The famous documentary Grass: A Nation's Battle for Life (1925) tells the story of the migration of Bakhtiari tribe from winter quarters in Khuzestan to summer quarters Chahar Mahaal. This film also tells the story of how these people crossed the river Karun with 50,000 people and 125,000 animals. The documentary People of the Wind (1975) retraces this same journey, 50 years later. The British documentary series The Ascent of Man (1973) in the first part of its second episode, "The Harvest of the Seasons," also shows the Bakhtiari making the annual migration to the summer pastures. This portrayal is not particularly positive, using the Bakhtiari as an example of a pre-agricultural tribe frozen in time. As of 2006, the migration still takes place, although the livestock are now transported in trucks, and the shepherds no longer walk barefoot in the snow between provinces.

Music
The Bakhtiari are noted in Iran for their remarkable music which inspired Alexander Borodin.

Culture

Livelihood and dwellings 
Bakhtiari nomads migrate twice a year with their herds for pasture: in spring to the mountains in their summer quarters (sardsīr or yaylāq), and in autumn to valleys and the plains in their winter quarters (garmsīr or qishlāq). The livestock the Bakhtiari mainly raise are goats, sheep, horses, and cattle. However, some Bakhtiari also engage in agricultural occupations, and mostly cultivate wheat and other cereal grains. Nomadic Baktiari rely on trading and bartering with nearby villages and populations to obtain products they don't have or are unable to create themselves (like agricultural goods). Temporary dwellings for the Bakhtiari include rectangular tents or brush or wood shelters. These types of dwellings are used when moving their herds around. Recently, some Bakhtiari have urbanized  and began to settle in large villages and even in cities.

Language, gender, and religion 

Shia Islam is the main religion followed by both the nomadic and sedentary Bakhtiaris. However, a recent report indicates that there is a growing Zoroastrian movement among Bakhtiari Lurs.

Despite the patriarchal nature of Bakhtiari society, women enjoy a rather high degree of freedom. This was because of their importance in the Bakhtiari economy as weavers, in which colorful and stylish designs on carpets made them very popular among buyers. However, after the Iranian Revolution of 1979, the Bakhtiari (along with Iranian society in general) underwent rapid changes so presently, Bakhtiari women don't have the same kind of privileges they had before the revolution.

Famous Bakhtiaris
Bahman Ala'eddin (Masood Bakhtiari), the most famous singer in the Bakhtiari dialect.
Davar Ardalan, NPR producer and author, whose mother Mary Laleh Bakhtiar is a Bakhtiari.
Sardar Assad, Bakhtiari Haft Lang Chieftain and Constitutionalist.
Laleh Bakhtiar, author and former professor at the University of Chicago, who wrote a feminist re-interpretation of the Koran.
Rostam Amir Bakhtiar, Chief of Imperial Protocol (1953–1979).
Abbasgholi Bakhtiar, Minister of Industries & Mines (1979).
Abdolhamid Bakhtiar, Majles Deputy.
Abolhassan Bakhtiar, Iranian Ambassador to Canada (1979).
Agha Khan Bakhtiar, Minister of Labor (1957–1958), Head of the National Iranian Oil Company.
Gholam-Reza Bakhtiar, Sardar Bakhtiar, Deputy Governor of Esfahan.
Rudi Bakhtiar, former CNN and FOX TV news anchor and journalist.
Shahpour Bakhtiar, politician and Prime Minister of Iran (1979).
Teymur Bakhtiar, Iranian general and head of Savak.
Behnoosh Bakhtiari, Iranian actress.
David Bakhtiari, NFL player and offensive tackle for the Green Bay Packers.
Behrouz Bakhtiar Successful businessman and owner of Crosskeys Vineyards
Gholam-Hossein Bakhtiari (Sardar Mohtashem), Minister of War (1911–13, 1918).
Pezhman Bakhtiari, poet (1900–1974).
Shaghayegh Dehghan, Iranian television actress, half Bakhtiari.
Khalil Esfandiary-Bakhtiary, Iranian Ambassador to West Germany (1952–1961).
Soraya Esfandiary-Bakhtiary, Empress of Iran (1951–58).
Mirza Hideyatu'llah Ashtiani Bakhtiari (d.1892), Iran's finance minister during the Qajar period.
Eman Mobali, football player.
Fereydoon Moshiri, contemporary Persian poet.
Zargham Saltaneh, Ebrahim, commander and instrumental figure in the Constitutional Revolution of 1909.
Nasir Khan, Sardar Jang, Governor of Yazd.
Niloufar Bakhtiar Bakhtiari, founder of NBB Design London, Interior Architecture.
Mohsen Rezaei, former commander-in-chief of the Islamic Revolutionary Guard Corps.
Bijan Allipour, CEO of NISOC.
Bahram Akasheh, Iran's leading experts on earthquakes

See also
 Demographics of Iran
 Ethnic minorities in Iran
Siege of Kandahar
 Yaylag

References

Further reading 
 
 
 Ali Quli Khan Sardar Assad and A. Sepehr. Tarikhe Bakhtiari: Khulasat al-asar fi tarikh al-Bakhtiyar (Intisharat-i Asatir) (The History of Bakhtiari).  766 pages.  .  Asatir, Iran, 1997. In Persian.
 Bakhtiari language summary
 Shapour Bakhtiar.  Memoirs of Shapour Bakhtiar.  Habib Ladjevardi, ed.  Harvard University Press, Cambridge, 1996.  140 Pages.  In Persian.  .
 Soraya Esfandiary Bakhtiary.  Le Palais des Solitudes. France Loisirs, Paris, 1991.  .
 Ali Morteza Samsam Bakhtiari.  The Last of the Khans: The life of Morteza Quli Khan Samsam Bakhtiari.  iUniverse, New York, 2006. 215 pages. .
  in particular bullet point 2 on the role of Soraya Bakhtiari; compare with her account in Le Palais des Solitudes cited above.
 Arash Khazeni, The Bakhtiyari Tribes in the Iranian Constitutional Revolution, Comparative Studies of South Asia, Africa and the Middle East, 25, 2, Duke University Press, 2005.
 Pierre Loti.  Vers Ispahan.  Edition Calmann-Levy, Paris, 1925.  330 pages.  Travelogue with Bakhtiari contact.  See also Ross and Sackville-West from same period.
 Vita Sackville-West. Twelve Days: An account of a journey across the Bakhtiari Mountains in South-western Persia.  Doubleday, Doran & Co., New York, 1928.  143 pages.  Travelogue, see also Loti and Ross from same period.
 F. Vahman and G. Asatrian, Poetry of the Baxtiārīs: Love Poems, Wedding Songs, Lullabies, Laments, Copenhagen, 1995.

External links

 Bakhtiaris
 Minorities At Risk: Assessment for Bakhtiari in Iran
 Bakhtiari - travelling in Iran 1998
 A Bakhtiari folk-song sung by Shusha Guppy in the 1970s: The Lor Youth.
 Web-page dedicated to the documentary The Bakhtiari Alphabet by Dr Cima Sedigh at Sacred Heart University.Note: Some video clips as well as some production photographs of this documentary can be viewed through this web-page. The production photographs can directly be viewed here.
 
 
 

 
Indigenous peoples of Western Asia
Nomadic groups in Iran
Iranian nomads
Modern nomads
Pastoralists
Chaharmahal and Bakhtiari Province
Khuzestan Province
Isfahan Province
Luri tribes
Lorestan Province